The Large Combustion Plant Directive (LCPD, 2001/80/EC) was a European Union directive which required member states of the European Union to legislatively limit flue gas emissions from combustion plant having thermal capacity of 50 MW or greater.  The directive applied to fossil-fuel power stations, and other large thermal plant such as petroleum refineries and steelworks. The directive specified emission limits for sulphur dioxide, nitrogen oxides, and dust. The directive was issued in October 2001. It replaced the earlier EEC directive on large combustion plants, 88/609/EEC, issued in November 1988.

Under the terms of the directive, combustion plant built after 1987 had to comply with specific emissions limits. From 2007, plant built earlier than that could either opt to comply with the emissions limits, or "opt out". Plant which opted out were limited to a maximum of 20,000 hours of further operation, and had to close completely by the end of 2015. Across Europe, 205 plants have opted out, with Britain having the largest proportion of opted-out plant in terms of total capacity.

The Large Combustion Plant Directive was superseded by the Industrial Emissions Directive on 1 January 2016.

UK opted-out plant

The nine opted-out generating stations supplying the National Grid were:

Opted-out plant exists at four other sites; however, only certain plant at these sites is affected.
 Ballylumford power station,
 boilers 15 & 16 at Slough Heat & Power Ltd,
 boiler 3 at BP's Coryton Refinery, Stanford-le-Hope
 an E.ON site at Workington

References

External links
Directive 2001/80/EC  of the European Parliament and of the Council

Environmental law in the European Union
European Union directives